The 2017–18 Albany Great Danes women's basketball team represents the University at Albany, SUNY during the 2017–18 NCAA Division I women's basketball season. The Great Danes, led by second year head coach Joanna Bernabei-McNamee, play their home games at SEFCU Arena and were members of the America East Conference. They finished the season 24–8, 12–4 in America East play to finish in second place. They advanced to the semifinals of the America East women's tournament where they lost to Hartford. They received an automatic bid to the Women's National Invitation Tournament where they lost to Penn in the first round.

Bernabei-McNamee left Albany on April 10 after two seasons for Boston College. On May 14, former Army assistant head coach Colleen Mullen was named the new head coach for the Great Danes.

Media
All home games and conference road games will stream on either ESPN3 on AmericaEast.tv. Most road games will stream on the opponents website. Selected games will be broadcast on the radio on WCDB.

Roster

Schedule

|-
!colspan=9 style="background:#; color:white;"| Non-conference regular season

|-
!colspan=9 style="background:#; color:white;"| America East regular season

|-
!colspan=9 style="background:#; color:white;"| America East Women's Tournament

|-
!colspan=9 style="background:#; color:white;"| WNIT

Rankings
2017–18 NCAA Division I women's basketball rankings

See also
 2017–18 Albany Great Danes men's basketball team

References

Albany
Albany Great Danes women's basketball seasons
Albany Great Danes
Albany Great Danes
Albany